Oman Post is the official postal service of Oman.

History 
The first post office was opened in Muscat by the British Postal Department in 1856.

Oman Post was established in 2005 by the Royal Decree of His Majesty Sultan Qaboos bin Said.

Oman Post is a member of Universal Postal Union.

Branches 
Oman Post has 86 branches across the Sultanate.

ASYAD Express 
ASYAD Express ship packages to over 220 destinations. Along with its express services, it has domestic delivery across the Sultanate of Oman, with services like Cash on Delivery (COD) and customer fulfillment for e-commerce companies.

Leadership 
Nasser Al Sharji is currently the acting CEO of Oman Post.

Ownership 
Oman Post is an Asyad Group member company.

Arabian Sea Humpback whale 
Oman Post recently launched postage stamps featuring endangered species, Arabian Sea Humpback whale.

See also 
 Postage stamps and postal history of Muscat and Oman

References 

Communications in Oman

Postal organizations
2005 establishments in Oman
Universal Postal Union